Enrique Anderson-Imbert (February 12, 1910– December 6, 2000) was an Argentine novelist, short-story writer and literary critic.

Born in Córdoba, Argentina, the son of Jose Enrique Anderson and Honorina Imbert, Anderson-Imbert graduated from the University of Buenos Aires with a Ph.D. in 1946. From 1940 until 1947 he taught at the University of Tucumán. In 1947, he joined the faculty of the University of Michigan. He was awarded a Guggenheim Fellowship in 1954. He became the first Victor S. Thomas Professor of Hispanic Literature at Harvard University in 1965. Anderson-Imbert remained at Harvard until his retirement in 1980. He was elected a Fellow of the American Academy of Arts and Sciences in 1967.

Anderson-Imbert is best known for his brief "microcuentos" in which he blends fantasy and magical realism. His story "Sala de espera" is taken from The Cheshire Cat, written in 1965; he is also the author of the 1966 short story entitled "Taboo." He also penned the short stories "El Leve Pedro", "El Fantasma", and "Vudu".

With his wife, Margot (née Di Clerico), a librarian, Anderson-Imbert had a son and a daughter. He died on December 6, 2000 in Buenos Aires.

Bibliography

Essays
La flecha en el aire (1937)
Ibsen y su tiempo (1946)
Historia de la Literatura Hispanoamericana (1955), one vol.
Una aventura amorosa de Sarmiento (1969)
Teoría de cuento (1978)
La Crítica Literaria y sus Métodos (1979)
El Realismo Mágico y Otros Ensayos (1979)
Mentiras y Mentirosos en el Mundo de las Letras (1993)
La Prosa (1984)
Nuevos Estudios Sovre Letras Hispanas (1986)

Narratives
Vigilia (1934)
El Gato de Cheshire (1965)
El Grimorio (1969)
Victoria (1977)
La Botella de Klein (1978)
La Locura Juega al Ajedrez (1971)
Los Primeros Cuentos del Mundo (1978)
Anti-Story: an Anthology of Experimental Fiction (1971)
La Sandía

References

1910 births
2000 deaths
Argentine male writers
Argentine people of British descent
Fellows of the American Academy of Arts and Sciences
Harvard University faculty
People from Córdoba, Argentina
University of Buenos Aires alumni
University of Michigan faculty